Bryson Kelly (born July 1, 1989) is a former American football defensive lineman. He played college football at Central Washington University, Kelly was signed to the Oakland Raiders as a undrafted free agent in 2011 . He was a member of the Oakland Raiders, Wyoming Cavalry, Spokane Shock, Portland Steel, Calgary Stampeders, Washington Valor, Jacksonville Sharks, and Iowa Barnstormers.

Early life
Kelly attended Kamiak High School.

College career
Kelly played for the Santa Ana Dons from 2007 to 2008 and helped the Dons to 11 wins.

Kelly played for the Central Washington Wildcats from 2009 to 2010. Kelly was named Second-team All-Great Northwest Athletic Conference as a junior in 2009. Kelly was named First-team All-Great Northwest Athletic Conference as a senior in 2010.

Professional career

National Football League
Kelly signed with the Oakland Raiders as an undrafted free agent in 2011. Kelly was invited to rookie minicamp with the Seattle Seahawks in 2012, but did not sign with the team. Kelly attended rookie minicamp with the Carolina Panthers in 2013, but did not sign with the team.

Wyoming Cavalry
Kelly signed with the Wyoming Cavalry of the Indoor Football League in 2013 and stayed with the team through 2014.

Spokane Shock
On April 7, 2014, Kelly was assigned to the Spokane Shock. On September 24, 2017, Kelly had his rookie option exercised. Kelly took over as the Shock's starting fullback.

Portland Steel
Kelly was assigned to the Portland Steel on November 18, 2015.

Calgary Stampeders
Kelly signed with the Calgary Stampeders of the Canadian Football League.

Washington Valor
On May 16, 2017, Kelly was assigned to the Washington Valor. On May 17, 2017, Kelly was placed on reassignment.

Jacksonville Sharks
On June 12, 2017, Kelly signed with the Jacksonville Sharks.

References

External links
 Central Washington Wildcats bio

Living people
1989 births
Players of American football from San Diego
American football fullbacks
American football defensive linemen
Canadian football defensive linemen
American players of Canadian football
Santa Ana Dons football players
Central Washington Wildcats football players
Oakland Raiders players
Wyoming Cavalry players
Spokane Shock players
Portland Steel players
Calgary Stampeders players
Washington Valor players
Jacksonville Sharks players
Iowa Barnstormers players